Darjadun (also Romanized as Darjādūn; also known as Sarsarūgh) is a village in Dar Pahn Rural District, Senderk District, Minab County, Hormozgan Province, Iran. At the 2006 census, its population was 614, in 127 families.

References 

Populated places in Minab County